The Cayman Islands Coast Guard is the maritime security and search and rescue agency of the British Overseas Territory of the Cayman Islands. It was formed in late 2018 under the umbrella of the Royal Cayman Islands Police Service and was officially made as its own entity in 2021.

History

In 2018, the People's Progressive Movement-led coalition government pledged to form a Coast Guard to protect the interests of the Islands, especially in terms of illegal immigration and illegal drug importation as well as Search and Rescue. In mid-2018, the commander and second-in-command of the Cayman Islands Coast Guard were appointed. The first commanding officer appointed was Commander Robert Scotland and the second-in-command appointed was Lieutenant Commander Leo Anglin. In mid-2019, the commander and second-in-command took part in Operation Riptide, an international joint operation with the United States Coast Guard and the Jamaica Defense Force Coast Guard. This was the first deployment of the Cayman Islands Coast Guard and the first counternarcotic deployment of a Cayman Islands representative on a foreign military ship in 10 years.

In late November 2019, it was announced that the Cayman Islands Coast Guard would become operational in January 2020, with initial total of 21 Coast Guardsman, half of which would come from the joint marine unit, with further recruitment in the new year.

The legislation to establish the Cayman Islands Coast Guard was gazetted in 2021, after which the Cayman Islands Coast Guard officially became its own entity separate from the Cayman Islands Police Service. Its first cohort of 16 recruits graduated in March 2021.

Responsibilities
The Cayman Islands Coast Guard is responsible for maritime security, maritime enforcement of local laws and international laws in Cayman Islands waters, and compliance with conventions regarding safety at sea and pollution prevention.

Structure
The Cayman Islands Coast Guard has two main operational departments:
 Coast Guard
 Coast Guard Reserve

Within these two department are four main detachments:
 Headquarters Detachment,
 Sea Detachment,
 Shore Detachment,
 Sister Islands Detachment.

Commanding officers
As of September 2021, the commanding officer is Robert Scotland.

Ranks
Ranks of the Cayman Islands Coast Guard are almost exactly the same as the ranks in the Royal Navy.

Commissioned Officers
<noinclude>

Non-Commissioned Officers
<noinclude>

Aviation
The Cayman Islands Coast Guard currently relies on the expertise of the Royal Cayman Islands Police Service Air Operations Unit, for aerial search capabilities.

Vehicles
The Cayman Islands Coast Guard has a few land based vehicles, including SUVs and trucks.

See also 
 Cayman Islands Regiment
 Royal Cayman Islands Police Service
 Her Majesty's Coastguard
 United States Coast Guard
 Jamaica Defence Force#JDF Coast Guard

References 

Coast guards
Sea rescue organisations of the United Kingdom
Military of the Cayman Islands
Military units and formations established in 2021